The 1946 United States Senate elections in Ohio was held on November 5, 1946, alongside a concurrent special election to the same seat.

Former Republican Governor of Ohio and 1944 nominee for the U.S. vice presidency John W. Bricker defeated Democratic interim senator James W. Huffman, who had been appointed to fill the vacant seat left by Supreme Court Justice Harold Hitz Burton. In a concurrent special election to finish Burton's unexpired term, Republican Kingsley Taft defeated Henry P. Webber.

Background
Incumbent Senator Harold Hitz Burton resigned from office in October 1945 to accept a seat on the United States Supreme Court. Governor Frank Lausche appointed James W. Huffman to fill Burton's vacant seat until a successor could be duly elected. The special election to fill the seat was scheduled for November 5, 1946, concurrent with the election to the next full term.

Huffman did not run in the special election, but ran in the election for the full term beginning in 1947.

Democratic primary

Candidates
Marvin C. Harrison, former State Senator from Cleveland and candidate for U.S. Senate in 1944
James W. Huffman, interim appointee Senator
Edward A. Huth
Stephen M. Young, former U.S. Representative from Cleveland (representing Ohio at-large) (1933–37, 1941–43)

Results

General election

Results

Special election

See also 
 1946 United States Senate elections

References 

1946
Ohio
United States Senate
Ohio 1946
Ohio 1946
United States Senate 1946